The Sperrins or Sperrin Mountains are a range of mountains in Northern Ireland and one of the largest upland areas in Northern Ireland. The range stretches from Strabane eastwards to Slieve Gallion in Desertmartin and north towards Limavady, in the counties of Tyrone and Londonderry. The region has a population of some 150,000 and is a designated Area of Outstanding Natural Beauty.

Features
It has a distinctive glaciated landscape. The Glenshane Pass, part of the A6 Belfast to Derry road, is in the mountains and has notoriously bad weather in winter. Sawel Mountain is the highest peak in the Sperrins, and the seventh highest in Northern Ireland. Another of the Sperrins,  Carntogher (464 m), towers over the Glenshane Pass.

Geologically, the Sperrins are formed mostly from Precambrian metamorphic rocks, with some younger Ordovician igneous rocks in the southern flank of the range. The Mountains are very sparsely populated and provide habitat for a diverse range of birds and mammals. Red fox, Sika Deer, Pine Marten and Red Squirrels are commonly found there alongside Peregrine Falcons, Buzzards and Sparrowhawks. Visiting Golden Eagles from the neighbouring reintroduced Donegal population have been sighted across the range from Strabane to Draperstown although no breeding population has yet been established. The Mountains also provide one of the last refuges of Red Grouse in Northern Ireland.

List

Politics 
Sperrin was the name of a proposed United Kingdom constituency in the Sixth Periodic Review of Westminster constituencies.

See also
List of mountains in Ireland

References

External links 
Landscapes Unlocked - Aerial footage from the BBC Sky High series explaining the physical, social and economic geography of Northern Ireland.

Mountain ranges of Northern Ireland
Mountains and hills of County Tyrone
Areas of Outstanding Natural Beauty in Northern Ireland
Mountains and hills of County Londonderry
Protected areas of County Londonderry
Protected areas of County Tyrone